Bradley Glenn "Butch" Walker (born November 14, 1969) is an American singer-songwriter, musician, and record producer. He was the lead guitarist for the glam metal band SouthGang from the late 1980s to early 1990s as well as the lead vocalist and guitarist for rock band Marvelous 3 from 1997 until 2001.

Career

SouthGang 
Walker grew up in Cartersville, Georgia, working as a guitarist and performer in several rock bands in the 1980s, including Badd Boyz and Byte the Bullet. Byte the Bullet moved to Los Angeles in 1988 and were signed to Virgin Records within the year. The band then changed their name to SouthGang and released two albums, Tainted Angel in 1991 and Group Therapy in 1992. SouthGang was one of the first bands to tour China in the early 1990s, however they eventually disbanded after Virgin modified their contract and tried to send them in the wrong direction. Walker and the rest of the SouthGang members continue to remain on good terms.

The Floyds 
After Southgang, Walker formed a new band with ex-SouthGang members Jayce Fincher and Mitch McLee ( Doug Mitchell), calling themselves Floyd's Funk Revival after Walker's birthplace Floyd County, Georgia. Walker shared lead vocals in the band with Fincher's wife, Chrystina Lloree. They released one full-length album, Creamy. The album contained thirteen original tracks with Lloree taking a large share of the lead vocals and heavy reliance on guitar. 

The band then shortened their name to The Floyds. They released one self-titled album on the Deep South label, which contained ten original tracks along with a humorous intro piece. Bonus tracks included a cover of Duran Duran's "Rio", and a live rendition of the Shasta soda jingle from the late seventies. The style of both these albums was guitar-oriented, mainstream rock with mild funk influences, and was a forerunner to the more basic guitar-oriented rock approach Walker took later with Marvelous 3. 

Although the albums are highly regarded among fans, they failed to sell many copies and are now quite rare. They are highly coveted by fans of Butch Walker, and the few copies that surface in the used CD market today command high prices.

Marvelous 3 
In 1997, Walker, Fincher, and McLee scaled back to a trio and adopted a power pop sound with Walker handling lead vocals. Calling themselves Marvelous 3, they released the album Math and Other Problems in 1997. They followed this in 1999 with Hey! Album and had a minor hit with the song "Freak of the Week". The next year, they released their final album, ReadySexGo, which failed to continue the momentum created by the prior releases, and perceiving a lack of support from their record label, they disbanded in 2001. Their final concert was on August 3, 2001 at Atlanta's Centennial Olympic Park in front of their hometown fans.

Solo 
Butch Walker then began a solo career, releasing the albums Left of Self-Centered in 2002, Letters in 2004 and The Rise and Fall of Butch Walker and the Let's-Go-Out-Tonites in 2006. In 2005 he played over 200 live shows across both the U.S. and Japan, and he released his first DVD, Live at Budokan. At the end of 2005, he was named as Rolling Stone'''s producer of the year. Butch Walker was featured as a headlining artist on the MySpace-promoted Inaugural Hotel Cafe tour, supporting independent artists from the Los Angeles venue of the same name.

In 2008, Walker released the live album Leavin' the Game on Luckie Street. He then collaborated with Michael Chislett of The Academy Is... and Darren Dodd of The Let's Go Out Tonites under the name 1969, releasing a full-length debut album titled Maya on April 1, 2008. 

His 4th album, Sycamore Meadows, was released on November 11, with the first single being "The Weight of Her". A music video was released for "Ships in a Bottle" which documents Walker walking on the grounds of his home on Sycamore Meadows Drive in Southern California after it was destroyed by the wildfires of November 2007. Both Maya and Sycamore Meadows were released on a limited run of vinyl.

Walker played a series of sold-out live shows with just acoustic guitar and vocals beginning in fall 2009, accompanied at various times by Pink, actor Jeremy Piven, Jim Bianco, the Chapin Sisters, Gregory Macdonald of Sloan (band) and more. Out of the shows came a cover of Taylor Swift's single "You Belong with Me" on banjolin, which was later recorded as a video and audio version in his studio. Swift blogged about the video and then invited Walker to appear with her at the winter 2010 Grammy Awards.

Walker began work on his next album in 2009, and ultimately released I Liked It Better When You Had No Heart on February 23, 2010 under the band name Butch Walker & the Black Widows. Recording sessions were held at RubyRed Productions in Santa Monica, California. Walker's support of the record included touring with Train beginning March 2010, a headlining tour of the US, and opening for Pink in Europe on her Stadium Festival Tour.

On August 30, 2011 Butch Walker released his second album with the Black Widows, titled The Spade. On October 25, 2011 Walker released his first book, an autobiography entitled Drinking with Strangers: Music Lessons from a Teenage Bullet Belt. In late 2012, Walker was featured on the show Live from Daryl's House on MTV Live (then Palladia).

Following the release of two EPs in 2013 and 2014, Walker released his seventh full-length album, Afraid of Ghosts, on February 3, 2015. The album was produced by Ryan Adams.

In June 2016 it was announced that Walker's upcoming album would be titled Stay Gold. It was released on August 26, 2016, on Dangerbird Records in the United States and on Lojinx in Europe. The album is once again self-produced by Walker, with the songs "Stay Gold", "East Coast Girl" and "Descending" (featuring Ashley Monroe) issued before the album's release.

On March 27, 2020, Butch premiered the first promo track for his upcoming album named American Love Story, which is set to be released on May 8. This song, "Pretty Crazy", was released on social media and streaming services.

On July 25, 2022, Butch released the music video for "Holy Water Hangover" off his upcoming tenth studio album Butch Walker as...Glenn due out August 26 of the same year. 

Productions and collaborations
Butch Walker has been called "one of America's best singer-songwriters" by Rolling Stone. He has penned choruses for artists ranging from Frank Turner to Fall Out Boy. He has produced and composed multiple Pink records and songs including "Leave Me Alone (I’m Lonely)" from I'm Not Dead, "Bad Influence" from Funhouse, and "Heartbreak Down" from Greatest Hits... So Far!!!In 2019, he was a producer on Green Day's highly anticipated 2020 release, Father of All Motherfuckers, which debuted at number four on the US Billboard 200.

Butch Walker worked with Weezer on their albums Raditude and Pacific Daydream. Walker mentioned working with the band during a radio interview with 99X. Walker co-wrote and produced several songs on Raditude, including the first single, "If You're Wondering if I Want You To... (I Want You To)", which hit number two on the Modern Rock Chart.

In 2007, Walker provided guest vocals on Fall Out Boy's third record Infinity on High, on the track, "You're Crashing, but You're No Wave", and co-produced the track "Don't You Know Who I Think I Am?" with singer Patrick Stump. He also made a brief cameo in the video for "This Ain't A Scene, It's An Arms Race". In 2012, Walker produced Fall Out Boy’s fifth studio album Save Rock and Roll, which debuted at number one on the U.S. Billboard 200, earning the band’s second career number one.

In 2007, Walker also helped write and produce Panic! At The Disco’s album, Vices & Virtues. Preceded by the lead single, "The Ballad of Mona Lisa", the album debuted at number seven on the Billboard 200 selling 56,000 copies within its first week. The album has sold 750,000 copies worldwide.

Walker also appears in The Academy Is... videos for "Slow Down" and "We've Got a Big Mess on Our Hands" as well as the video for "So What" by Pink. He also co-wrote the songs "Breaking" and "Younglife", both of which are performed and co-written by Anberlin.

Walker also joined the 9th annual Independent Music Awards judging panel to assist independent musicians' careers.[17] He was also a judge for the 8th annual Independent Music Awards.[18] In 2008 Walker signed on to judge a competition called Spin's Hot Pursuit to find an unsigned band for Epic Records/Original Signal hosted on Music Nation.[19]

In January 2009, post-hardcore band Saosin tapped Walker to produce their second album for Capitol Records.

In March 2009, the song "Open Happiness" debuted, a new business venture by Coca-Cola, written by Walker, and featuring Cee-Lo Green, Brendon Urie, Patrick Stump, Janelle Monáe and Travis McCoy. This song has a Cantonese cover version by Joey Yung on her new album, A Time For Us, and she is also filming advertisements for Coca-Cola in Chinese.

In 2012, Walker produced the song "Everything Has Changed", written and recorded by Taylor Swift and Ed Sheeran for Swift's fourth studio album, Red. In 2021, Walker produced the re-recorded version of the song for Swift's second re-recorded album, Red (Taylor's Version).

In 2022, Walker produced the song "August is Falling" by pop-punk band August is Falling, featuring on the EP The Simple Plan. The song received widespread commercial and critical acclaim and in the months following its release brought pop-punk as a genre back into public consciousness. 

Many of the songs that he co-wrote or produced have been hits for other artists, including SR-71, Avril Lavigne, Sevendust, Injected, The Donnas, Hot Hot Heat, American Hi-Fi, Default, Gob, Midtown, Puffy AmiYumi, Pink, Katy Perry, Pete Yorn, Quietdrive, Green Day, Adam Lambert, Rob Thomas of Matchbox 20, Rayland Baxter, Kevin Griffin of Better Than Ezra, Train, The Wallflowers, Jewel, The All-American Rejects, The Academy Is..., The Cab, Saosin, Never Shout Never, Weezer, New Politics, Fall Out Boy, The Struts, Andrew McMahon in the Wilderness, August is Falling, Matt Nathanson, and Elizabeth Cook.

 Documentary film 
The documentary Out of Focus premiered at the Nashville Film Festival in April 2012. Directed by Shane Valdés and Peter Harding, it focuses on Butch Walker's life and music. Its first European showing was at Oldenburg Filmfest, Germany in August 2012.

Personal life
In November 2007, Walker and his family lost all of their possessions, including the master recordings to every song he had ever recorded, when the Malibu home he was renting from Flea of the Red Hot Chili Peppers burned down as a result of a wildfire in Southern California. He titled his next album Sycamore Meadows after the street the house was on.

He currently lives in Nashville, TN with his wife and son.

Butch is an ordained minister in the state of Ohio. At a concert September 7, 2016, at the House of Blues in Cleveland, Ohio, Butch climbed off the stage and into the crowd to marry a couple live before the end of the show.

Discography

Studio albums

Live and other albums
 This Is Me... Justified and Stripped (2004)
     Acoustic: Live In Atlanta (2005)
 Leavin' the Game on Luckie Street (2008)
 Over the Holidays and Under the Influence (2017) #20 Heatseekers American Love Story: Live & Quarantined (2021)

EPs
 Heartwork (2004)
 Cover Me Badd (2005)
 Live at Lollapalooza 2008 (2008)
 Here Comes The... EP (2009)
 Peachtree Battle (2013) #127 US, #3 Heatseekers End of the World (One More Time) / Battle vs. The War (2014)
 Cassette Backs (2016)

DVDs
     This Is Me... Justified and Stripped (2003)
 Live at Budokan (2005)
 Leavin' the Game on Luckie Street (2008)
     Butch Walker: Out of Focus (2013)

Book
    Drinking with Strangers: Music Lessons from a Teenage Bullet Belt (2011)

Featured In
 "One Tree Hill (soundtrack)" by various artists (2005)
 "You're Crashing, But You're No Wave" by Fall Out Boy (2007)
 "Christmas All Over Again" duet with Taryn Manning (2008)
 "Good Times" by Tommy Lee (2005)
 "One Night in New York" by The Whiskey Gentry (2013)
 "Better Than That" by Suzanne Santo (2017)
 "I'm Not In Love" by The Dove & the Wolf (2018)
 "Clock Work" by Asian Kung-Fu Generation (2018)

As a producer
 Marvelous 3 – Math and Other Problems (1997)
 Marvelous 3 – Hey! Album (1998)
 Me, Myself & Irene (Music from the Motion Picture) (2000)
 SR-71 - Now You See Inside - "Right Now" (2000)
 Marvelous 3 – Ready, Sex, Go (2000)
 More Fast and Furious: Music from and Inspired by the Motion Picture The Fast and the Furious (2001)
 Injected – Burn It Black (2002)
 Bowling for Soup – Drunk Enough to Dance (2002)
 Butch Walker - Left of Self-Centered (2002)
 Stroke 9 - Rip It Off (2002)
 Spider-Man: Music from and Inspired By (2002)
 The Hot Chick (Soundtrack) (2002)
 The Scorpion King (Soundtrack) (2002)
 SR-71 – Tomorrow (2002)
 Pete Yorn – Day I Forgot (2003)
 Agent Cody Banks (Soundtrack) (2003)
 Default – Elocation (2003)
 Gob – Foot in Mouth Disease (2003)
 Ike - Parallel Universe (2003)
 Mars Needs Women - Red Means Go (2003)
 Sevendust – Seasons (2003)
 Bowling for Soup - A Hangover You Don't Deserve (2004)
 Midtown – Forget What You Know (2004)
 The Donnas – Gold Medal (2004)
 Butch Walker - Letters (2004)
 Scooby-Doo 2: Monsters Unleashed (Soundtrack) (2004)
 Spider-Man 2 (Original Soundtrack) (2004)
 Avril Lavigne – Under My Skin (2004)
 Lindsay Lohan – A Little More Personal (2005)
 A Lot Like Love (Music from the Motion Picture) (2005)
 Bowling for Soup - Bowling for Soup Goes to the Movies (2005)
 Elektra: The Album (Original Soundtrack) (2005)
 American Hi-Fi - Hearts on Parade (2005)
 Wakefield – Which Side Are You On? (2005)
 Family Force 5 – Business Up Front/Party in the Back (2006)
 Butch Walker - Cover Me Badd (2006)
 Happy Feet: Music from the Motion Picture (2006)
 Pink – I'm Not Dead (2006)
 Rock Star Supernova – Rock Star Supernova (2006)
 Sound of Superman (2006)
 PUFFY AmiYumi – Splurge (2006)
 The Bronx - The Bronx (2006)
 Bowling for Soup – The Great Burrito Extortion Case (2006)
 Butch Walker - The Rise and Fall of Butch Walker and the Let's-Go-Out-Tonites (2006)
 Quietdrive – When All That's Left Is You (2006)
 Pete Yorn – Nightcrawler (2006)
 Hot Hot Heat – Happiness Ltd. (2007)
 Fall Out Boy - Infinity on High - "Don't You Know Who I Think I Am?" (2007)
 Instant Karma: The Amnesty International Campaign to Save Darfur - "Imagine" [Avril Lavigne] (2007) 
 P.S. I Love You (Original Motion Picture Soundtrack) (2007)
 PUFFY AmiYumi – Honeycreeper (2007)
 The Academy Is... – Santi (2007)
 The Honorary Title – Scream & Light Up the Sky (2007)
 Avril Lavigne – The Best Damn Thing (2007)
 Secondhand Serenade – A Twist in My Story (2008)
 Pink – Funhouse (2008)
 Katy Perry – One of the Boys (2008)
 Butch Walker - Sycamore Meadows (2008)
 The Automatic – This Is a Fix (2008)
 Plastiscines – About Love (2009)
 Dashboard Confessional – Alter the Ending (2009)
 The Films – Oh, Scorpio! (2009)
 Saosin – In Search of Solid Ground (2009)
 PUFFY AmiYumi – Bring It! (2009)
 The Von Bondies - Love Hate and Then There's You (2009)
 Hot Chelle Rae - Lovesick Electric (2009)
 All Time Low – Nothing Personal (2009)
 Weezer – Raditude (2009)
 Train - Save Me, San Francisco (2009)
 Almost Alice (Music Inspired by the Motion Picture) (2010)
 Hey Monday - Beneath It All - "Hangover" (2010)
 The Maine – Black & White (2010)
 Butch Walker & The Black Widows - I Liked It Better When You Had No Heart (2010)
 Ida Maria – Katla (2010)
 Mishka - Talk About (2010)
 Never Shout Never – What Is Love? (2010)
 All Time Low - Dirty Work (2011)
 Avril Lavigne – Goodbye Lullaby (2011)
 Gin Wigmore – Gravel & Wine (2011)
 Happy Feet Two (Original Motion Picture Soundtrack) (2011)
 Gavin DeGraw – Sweeter (2011)
 Eulogies - Tear the Fences Down (2011)
 Butch Walker & The Black Widows - The Spade (2011)
 The Wombats – This Modern Glitch (2011)
 Panic! at the Disco – Vices & Virtues (2011)
 Train - California 37 (2012)
 Taylor Swift – Red (2012)
 Pink – The Truth About Love (2012)
 Lit – The View from the Bottom (2012)
 Big B - Fool's Gold (2013)
 Keith Urban – Fuse – "Even the Stars Fall 4 U" (2013)
 Gavin DeGraw - Make a Move (2013)
 Butch Walker - Peachtree Battle (2013)
 Fall Out Boy – Save Rock and Roll (2013)
 Panic! at the Disco – Too Weird to Live, Too Rare to Die! (2013)
 Big Hero 6 (Original Motion Picture Soundtrack) (2014)
 Train - Bulletproof Picasso (2014)
 Christina Perri - Head or Heart (2014)
 Butch Walker - Afraid of Ghosts (2015)
 Fall Out Boy - American Beauty/American Psycho (2015)
 Frank Turner – Positive Songs for Negative People (2015)
 Harry Connick Jr. - That Would Be Me (2015)
 Brian Fallon – Painkillers (2016)
 Gavin DeGraw - Something Worth Saving (2016)
 Butch Walker - Stay Gold (2016)
 Suicide Squad: The Album - "Bohemian Rhapsody" [Panic! at the Disco] (2016)
 Carly Rae Jepsen - Everywhere You Look (2016)
 Suzanne Santo - Ruby Red (2017)
 MisterWives - Connect the Dots (2017)
 New Politics - Lost in Translation (2017)
 Weezer - Pacific Daydream (2017)
 Fall Out Boy - M A N I A (2018)
 Matt Nathanson - Sings His Sad Heart (2018) 
 Andrew McMahon - Upside Down Flowers (2018)
 The Aces - When My Heart Felt Volcanic (2018) 
 rayLand baxter - Wide Awake (2018)
 The Struts - Young & Dangerous (2018)
 Peanut Butter Falcon (Original Motion Picture Soundtrack) (2019)
 Rob Thomas - Chip Tooth Smile (2019)
 Green Day - Father of All Motherfuckers (2020)
 Adam Lambert - Velvet (2020)
 Butch Walker - American Love Story (2020)
 Taylor Swift – Red (Taylor's Version) (2021)
 The Wallflowers - Exit Wounds (2021)
 Jewel - Freewheelin' Woman (2022)
 August is Falling - The Simple Plan EP (2022)

References

External links

 
Butch Walker – Dangerbird Records
Butch Walker – Lojinx Records
Butch Walker on Last.fm
Butch Walker on DeliRadio
2009 Interview Podcast with Butch Walker on BackstageMusician.Com
Interview from 2002 from PlugInMusic.com
Butch Walker's Top 10 Albums of 2008
Butch Walker Production Credit List (Discography)
Trailer of the documentary movie "Out of Focus" (2012)

1969 births
Living people
Lead guitarists
American rock guitarists
American male guitarists
American male singer-songwriters
American rock songwriters
American rock singers
American male pop singers
Record producers from Georgia (U.S. state)
Crush Management artists
Musicians from Atlanta
Lojinx artists
People from Rome, Georgia
Guitarists from Georgia (U.S. state)
20th-century American guitarists
20th-century American male musicians
Dangerbird Records artists
Singer-songwriters from Georgia (U.S. state)